Michael Shepherd, CBE, FRCP, FRCPsych (Hon), FAPA (Corr), FAPHA (30 July 1923 – 21 August 1995) was one of the most influential and internationally respected psychiatrists of his time, formerly Professor of Epidemiological Psychiatry, Institute of Psychiatry and Consultant Psychiatrist, The Maudsley Hospital, London and author of a number of influential publications in the field of psychiatry, including the seminal work Psychiatric Illness in General Practice.

Early life
Michael Shepherd was born on 30 July 1923 in Cardiff of a Jewish family with its roots in Odessa and Poland. He attended Cardiff High School and pursued his medical studies at the Medical School of Oxford University and the Radcliffe Infirmary. He was there influenced by the teaching of John Ryle, Professor of Social Medicine. Whilst under his tutorage, Shepherd was asked to visit a patient in her own home in Cowley in order to learn about the socio-medical significance of cardiac invalidism. Through such examples, Shepherd discerned the potential value to psychiatry of systematic research into the social causes of mental disorder. After qualifying he went on to complete his house appointments, and also his National Service in the Royal Air Force.

Career
Shepherd began his psychiatric career at The Maudsley Hospital in 1947. In 1954 he obtained his Doctorate in Medicine from Oxford University, his thesis being a study of the pattern of major psychoses in the county of Buckinghamshire during two periods, 1931–33 and 1945–47. In 1956 he joined the staff of the Institute of Psychiatry as a Senior Lecturer, and then in 1961 he was appointed to the institute's Readership in Psychiatry. In 1967 he had conferred on him a personal chair of epidemiological psychiatry, the first of its kind in the world. He became a Fellow of the Royal College of Physicians in 1970 and a Foundation Fellow of the Royal College of Psychiatrists in 1971. He established the General Practice Research Unit at the Institute of Psychiatry in the late 1950s and continued to direct its activities until his retirement in 1988. He was also the founder editor of the journal Psychological Medicine and he was appointed a CBE in 1989. During his career he also became a Fellow of both the American Public Health Association and the American Psychological Association.

Shepherd was heavily influenced during his early years at The Maudsley by Aubrey Lewis, who taught that the precise and well-organised collection of social data should become a new activity for the psychiatrist rather than limiting himself to the clinical study of the individual patient. Shepherd's close working relationship with Lewis later resulted in a careful documentation of Lewis' legacies to psychiatry in his remarkable biographies. With the exception of one year's attachment to the School of Public Health at Johns Hopkins University, Baltimore, in 1955–56, Shepherd remained at The Maudsley for the entire duration of his professional career.

Role of GPs in the treatment of psychiatric illness
One of his outstanding contributions was to focus attention on the role of the NHS general practitioner in the treatment of patients with minor psychiatric illness. This was an important facet of the General Practice Research Unit which he established under the auspices of the Department of Health and Social Security. In 1986 the Chief Medical Officer of the Department of Health and Social Security wrote:

"Within the structure of the National Health Service, the medical responsibility for the care of (emotionally disturbed) patients falls principally on the general practitioner."

He went on to give credit to Shepherd for having carried out the work which clarified the nature and extent of these disorders. He further stated that the results of his enquiries had considerable implications for the organisation of medical services in Britain and for medical education. This was in stark contrast to the opinion two decades earlier when the medical correspondent of The Times (summarising an article in The Practitioner) stated that "the optimal management of neurotic patients by their general practitioners is not possible under the National Health Service" due to the time it would take.

Shepherd's research and influence led to a much closer scrutiny of the needs of the numerous patients encountered in general practice with psychological disorders, and also resulted in an increase in the personnel composing the professional team in primary care. Shepherd's seminal work Psychiatric Illness in General Practice (published in 1966) was the catalyst for this whole area of mental health research and policy for the best part of 30 years. It has been suggested that the resources available to the psychiatrists themselves remained stagnant and yet it is to them that virtually all the acute and serious cases of mental illness are referred straight away Also, Shepherd's insistence that the mental health services could only be enhanced by better training and better support for GPs rather than a proliferation of psychiatrists did not endear him to many of his psychiatric colleagues. However, not only has it been praised by the Chief Medical Officer, it has also been endorsed by a succession of World Health Organization declarations and is enshrined in a variety of Government strategy documents, including the 1992 publication, "The Health of the Nation".

Clinician
Shepherd's noted clinical study on the symptom of morbid jealousy early in his career led him to the conclusion that a medical opinion is of most value when the inter-personal and social aspects of a case are as closely understood as the narrower issue of diagnosis. He went on to apply these precepts to the full range of psychiatric disorders. Despite the value he gained from this study, Shepherd immediately became less concerned with the minutiae of clinical or experimental research and left the spadework to his team of research workers. As a clinician, Shepherd's style has been described as "unusual". He continued to be involved in clinical work until his retirement, although day-to-day management of his patients was delegated. His detachment was described as "Olympian" and was captured by a former patient in the lines of her book thus:

"a tall dark pale man, with a chillingly superior glance and quellingly English voice made another appointment to see me. I knew that if anyone could discover the 'truth' it would be he alone or with his colleagues."

Tackling conceptual issues in psychiatry
One of Shepherd's legacies is the progress he made in helping the profession define and clarify difficult conceptual issues. He wrote extensively on the thorny problems of psychiatric classifications, psychopathology and the causation of mental illness. He was renowned for his "adroit dissection of poorly defined concepts" and for his success in clarifying them in his writings. In his 1987 article on the Formulation of New Research Strategies on Schizophrenia he concluded that the most persistent obstacle remained that of the reliable identification of schizophrenia. He went on to instigate the move towards obtaining international agreement for the definition of schizophrenia in communicable form He also wrote extensively on the general psychopathology of Karl Jaspers illuminating his belief that the main appeal of Jaspers' book as its breadth in extending the field of general psychopathology from the natural sciences, via phenomenology, to existentialist philosophy. In other words, the complex field of psychopathology had to be explored not only through biological science but through an analysis of what essentially belongs to Man and not man as a species of animal. Despite the seminal nature of Jasper's book, it is also recognized that it contains no clear definition of psychopathology, a weakness addressed by Shepherd who went about successfully converting English speaking psychiatrists to this work both through his essays and by instituting in the late 1950s a course of seminars on psychopathology for the benefit of doctors training in psychiatry at the Maudsley Hospital.

Biographical essays
Shepherd used biographical essays as a vehicle to reveal his own personal philosophy and his leanings in psychiatry. Most notable are those centred on the achievements of people he admired including John Ryle, Aubrey Lewis and Jean Starobinski. In particular, Shepherd revered Lewis, whom he called a "Representative Psychiatrist". Kenneth Rawnsley suggested that he identified in his mentor the very qualities that he aspired to himself: intellectual integrity, scholarship, a vast range of knowledge and a cultivated capacity for juridical thought.

Hammer of Psychoanalysis
Shepherd was described by colleagues as the "Hammer of Psychoanalysis", although he was not totally antipathetic towards its use. The conclusion he drew in his essay entitled "Sherlock Holmes and the case of Dr Freud", where he compared the Sherlock Holmes method of drawing sweeping inferences from trivial clues with Freud's analytic method for examining the human mind, was that in both cases the method is viewed as essentially intuitive and devoid of logic. He coined the term neologism "mythod" to describe their method embedded in a myth, devoid of scientific value. Although he conceded reluctantly that psychoanalysis might still have some value as an arching metaphor, he demolished psychoanalysis as a scientific discipline.

Founding editor of Psychological Medicine
During Shepherd's career, he wrote and co-authored over 30 books and around 200 original articles including the five volumes of the Handbook of Psychiatry. However, perhaps his finest literary legacy was the establishment of what has been described as "arguably the finest psychiatric journal in the English-speaking world", the journal Psychological Medicine. He was the founding editor of Psychological Medicine from 1969 until 1993. He favoured the term "Psychological Medicine" over "Psychiatry" and he attached great importance to the title which he resurrected from the Journal of Psychological Medicine, first conceived by Forbes Winslow. He defined psychological medicine as including not only psychiatry but also the study of abnormal behaviour from the medical point of view. He aimed to concentrate on original high-quality work across the wide spectrum of both psychiatry and its allied disciplines and contributed extensively himself investing much time and care towards its success. According to his successor, Psychological Medicine was to become perhaps his greatest and most enduring creation set in an academic and research career which was already highly distinguished.

Teacher
As a teacher he has been described as being without peer. He was an incorrigible opponent of the growing mass-production trends in contemporary university teaching with their emphasis on multiple-choice examination and impersonal teaching methods. He shunned didactic teaching but used the Socratic method of teaching by cross-questioning and challenging remaining devoted to the tutorial approach of which he was a "consummate practitioner". He jealously guarded his own opinions on controversial issues and remained enigmatic, provoking powerful exchanges of views. Former students of Shepherd have stated that he was a  "challenging, provocative and inspiring teacher". He was renowned for his single-minded dedication to the scientific method and his incisive analytical skills, and hostility to vague speculation. His scepticism was not ideologically based and he was as likely to turn his critical gaze upon the contemporary enthusiasm for more detailed psychiatric classification as he was of the more established Freudian movement.

He was served by generations of young research workers whose assistance helped him achieve the epidemiological studies for which he is renowned. Conversely, he was the inspiration behind their efforts and psychiatric careers that followed. A former student, Anthony Clare, has said that he was without equal in his record of selecting, nurturing and encouraging young men and women who would go on to fill senior academic posts in Britain and throughout the world. He was noted for identifying able and committed doctors in Africa, Asia, South America and Eastern Europe on his travels there. He often raised funds for their salaries, and took a great personal involvement in their research topics and apprenticeships securing them "a foot on the ladder of academic achievement" whilst helping to maintain The Maudsley's position as one of the world's great postgraduate centres for psychiatric teaching and research.

A former researcher of Michael Shepherd wrote:

"His students will always remember the spidery red ink which took apart their best efforts, and the equally spidery black ink with a small message attached to an article he thought relevant to the current problem, always signed MS."

Honours and awards
Michael Shepherd received professional recognition with the presentation of:

 Donald Reid Medal for Epidemiology in 1982.
 Rema Lapouse Award of the American Public Health Association in 1983.

He was honoured with:
 CBE in 1989.
 Honorary Fellowship of the Royal College of Psychiatrists in 1990.
 Honorary Fellowship of the Royal Society of Medicine in 1995 shortly before his death.

Family and personal life
Shepherd was described as an entertaining companion whose breadth of knowledge was dazzling. He had a multitude of interests from ballet to rugby football, and took a great personal interest in the personal lives and backgrounds of those with whom he worked. He was a truly cultured man, well versed in literature and fluent in several languages. He was also a modest man, despite his pre-eminence in his field. Although described as being usually reticent in any exchange of personal emotion, he was also at heart a private and family man. He married Margaret Rock in 1947, a school teacher and together they had four children, two daughters, Catherine and Lucy, and two sons, Simon and Daniel, whom they raised in a large house on Alleyn Park Road in West Dulwich, south London, a relatively short distance from Maudsley Hospital. He was devastated by the death of his wife after a long illness in 1992 and withdrew for a period from public appearances. At the time of Michael Shepherd's death on 21 August 1995, he had two grandsons, his first granddaughter being born a few days after his death.

Selected publications
 A Study of the Major Psychoses in an English County, 1957;
 Psychiatric Illness in General Practice, 1966, London: Oxford University Press;
 (et al.) An experimental approach to psychiatric diagnosis, Acta Psychiatrica Scandinavica, 210. Suppl, 1968;
 Psychotropic Drugs in Psychiatry, 1981;
 Handbook of Psychiatry, 1982;
 Psychiatrists on Psychiatry, 1983;
 The Anatomy of Madness, 1985 (co-editor with William Bynum and Roy Porter);
 Sherlock Holmes and the Case of Dr Freud, 1985;
 A representative psychiatrist: the career, contributions and legacies of Sir Aubrey Lewis, Psychological Medicine Supplement 10. Cambridge:Cambridge University Press, 1988;
 Primary care of patients with mental disorder in the community, British Medical Journal, 299. 666–669, 1989
 Conceptual Issues in Psychological Medicine, 1990, London: Tavistock
 Two faces of Kraepelin, British Journal of Psychiatry. 167, 174–183, 1995

References

1923 births
1995 deaths
British psychiatrists
Donald Reid Medalists
British public health doctors
Commanders of the Order of the British Empire
Fellows of the Royal College of Physicians
Fellows of the Royal College of Psychiatrists
20th-century British medical doctors
Jewish psychiatrists
Alumni of the University of Oxford
20th-century Royal Air Force personnel